Epichorista tenebrosa is a species of moth in the family Tortricidae. This species is endemic to New Zealand. It is found in Otago and has been collected in tussock grassland habitats. It is a late autumn emerging moth and adults are on the wing in February. It is classified as "At Risk, Relict'" by the Department of Conservation.

Taxonomy
This species was first described by Alfred Philpott in 1917 from a specimen collected at Ben Lomond by Charles E. Clarke in February. George Hudson discussed and illustrated this species in his 1928 book The Butterflies and Moths of New Zealand. The genus level classification of New Zealand endemic moths within Epichorista  is regarded as unsatisfactory and is under revision. As such this species is currently also known as Epichorista (s.l.) tenebrosa. The type specimen is held at the Auckland War Memorial Museum.

Description

Philpott described the species as follows:

Distribution

This species is endemic to New Zealand. It is found in the Otago. As well as its type locality, this species has also been found in Naseby State Forest, at Roaring Meg and South Rough Ridge Hill.

Behaviour
This species is a late autumn emerging moth. It is on the wing in February.

Habitat 
Hudson noted that the type specimen was found at an altitude of 4000 ft in tussock grasslands. The species has subsequently been collected from similar habitat.

Conservation status 
This moth is classified under the New Zealand Threat Classification system as being "At Risk, Relict".

References

Moths described in 1917
Epichorista
Moths of New Zealand
Endemic fauna of New Zealand
Endangered biota of New Zealand
Endemic moths of New Zealand